Karl-Heinz Stadtmüller (20 January 1953 – 13 September 2018) was an East German race walker. He was born in Berlin.

Achievements

References

1953 births
2018 deaths
East German male racewalkers
Athletes (track and field) at the 1972 Summer Olympics
Athletes (track and field) at the 1976 Summer Olympics
Athletes (track and field) at the 1980 Summer Olympics
Olympic athletes of East Germany
Athletes from Berlin
World Athletics Race Walking Team Championships winners